Marie Demy (born 30 November 1994) is a Belgian female badminton player.

Achievements

BWF International Challenge/Series
'Women's Singles''

 BWF International Challenge tournament
 BWF International Series tournament
 BWF Future Series tournament

References

External links
 

1994 births
Living people
Belgian female badminton players